Zoveyneh (also Romanized as Zoveynah; also known as Zoveneh and Zūyneh) is a village in Chah Salem Rural District, in the Central District of Omidiyeh County, Khuzestan Province, Iran. At the 2006 census, its population was 54, in 10 families.

References 

Populated places in Omidiyeh County